Klas Erik "Nello" Andersson (17 March 1896 – 23 February 1985) was a Swedish swimmer and water polo player.  He competed in water polo at the 1920 and 1924 Summer Olympics and finished in third and fourth place, respectively.  In 1912 he was eliminated in the first round of the 100 m freestyle swimming event.

Andersson was the youngest among four siblings: Robert was also a water polo player and swimmer and competed in the same team in 1920.  Adolf was a swimmer, and Selma was a diver.

See also
 List of Olympic medalists in water polo (men)

References

External links
 

1896 births
1985 deaths
Sportspeople from Stockholm
Swedish male freestyle swimmers
Swedish male water polo players
Olympic swimmers of Sweden
Olympic water polo players of Sweden
Swimmers at the 1912 Summer Olympics
Water polo players at the 1920 Summer Olympics
Water polo players at the 1924 Summer Olympics
Olympic bronze medalists for Sweden
Olympic medalists in water polo
Medalists at the 1920 Summer Olympics
Stockholms KK water polo players
20th-century Swedish people